Ajac is a commune in the Aude department, part of the Occitanie region, southern France.

Location 
Ajac is 7 km from the local market town of Limoux, and 30 km from the historic city of Carcassonne. Falling within the ancient region of Languedoc, Ajac is part of the Pays Cathare, an area rich with Medieval abbeys and castles.

Village Layout 
Although not a Circulade like neighboring villages, Ajac is built upon a hill with the chateau at the top and center. The chateau was the ancestral home of the  noble Montcalm and Lévis families, and birthplace of François Gaston de Lévis, Duc de Levis. Building of the chateau started in the 12th century, but has since had numerous alterations, most notably in the 18th century. It is now in private ownership.

The church of Ajac is of Romanesque origin, but rebuilt in the 18th century.

Sited within the foothills of the Eastern Pyrenees, the village is largely surrounded by agricultural land and vineyards. Both red and white wine grapes are grown locally, most notably for the production of Blanquette de Limoux, claimed by some to predate champagne.

History
The village of Ajac was given the name of the local count.

The local duke who was accused and hunted by the locals for accused treason against the king went into hiding. And the duke went into hiding. The duke was allowed to return on the condition that his authority not be passed on following his death. Therefore, Ajac remained independent until the French revolution and the establishment of the republic.

Administration
The current mayor of Ajac is Gérard Chaumond, reelected in 2020.

Population

Reversing the decline experienced by rural villages during the later half of the last century, the population of Ajac has latterly increased. A village school and part-time cafe have reopened to serve this changing demographic.

Personalities
 François Gaston de Lévis

See also
Communes of the Aude department

References

Communes of Aude